In the Vernacular (stylised as in the ver•nac‘u•lar) is the debut album led by saxophonist John Handy III featuring tracks recorded in 1958 and originally released on the Roulette label.

Reception

AllMusic awarded the album 4 stars and its review by Scott Yanow calls it "Excellent advanced hard bop music".

Track listing
All compositions by John Handy III except as indicated
 "I'll Close My Eyes" (Billy Reid) - 3:06
 "First Time" - 7:03
 "Suggested Line" - 5:30
 "Problem Too" - 4:28
 "Quote, Unquote" - 3:09
 "Blues in the Vernacular" - 5:09
 "Dance to the Lady" - 5:16
 "I'll Never Smile Again" (Ruth Lowe) - 3:37

Personnel 
John Handy III - alto saxophone
Richard Williams - trumpet
Roland Hanna - piano
George Tucker - bass
Bobby Fuhlrodt (track 2), Roy Haynes (tracks 1 & 3-8) - drums

References 

1958 debut albums
John Handy albums
Albums produced by Teddy Reig
Roulette Records albums